The 2001 VMI Keydets football team represented the Virginia Military Institute during the 2001 NCAA Division I-AA football season. It was the Keydets' 111th year of football and third season under head coach Cal McCombs. VMI went 1–10 on the year, with the lone win coming over Chattanooga in overtime.

Schedule

References

VMI
VMI Keydets football seasons
VMI Keydets football